Coming out of the closet, often shortened to coming out, is a metaphor used to describe LGBT people's self-disclosure of their sexual orientation, romantic orientation or gender identity.

Framed and debated as a privacy issue, coming out of the closet is experienced variously as a psychological process or journey; decision-making or risk-taking; a strategy or plan; a mass or public event; a speech act and a matter of personal identity; a rite of passage; liberation or emancipation from oppression; an ordeal; a means toward feeling gay pride instead of shame and social stigma; or even a career-threatening act. Author Steven Seidman writes that "it is the power of the closet to shape the core of an individual's life that has made homosexuality into a significant personal, social, and political drama in twentieth-century America".

Coming out of the closet is the source of other gay slang expressions related to voluntary disclosure or lack thereof. LGBT people who have already revealed or no longer conceal their sexual orientation or gender identity are out of the closet or simply out, i.e. openly LGBT. Oppositely, LGBT people who have yet to come out or have opted not to do so are labelled as closeted or being in the closet. Outing is the deliberate or accidental disclosure of an LGBT person's sexual orientation or gender identity by someone else, without their consent. By extension, outing oneself is self-disclosure. Glass closet means the open secret of when public figures' being LGBT is considered a widely accepted fact even though they have not officially come out.

History 

Between 1864 and 1869, Karl Heinrich Ulrichs wrote a series of pamphlets—as well as giving a lecture to the Association of German Jurists in 1867—advocating decriminalization of sex acts between men, in which he was candid about his own homosexuality. Historian Robert Beachy has said of him, "I think it is reasonable to describe [Ulrichs] as the first gay person to publicly out himself."

In early 20th-century Germany, "coming out" was called "self-denunciation" and entailed serious legal and reputational risks. In his 1906 work, Das Sexualleben unserer Zeit in seinen Beziehungen zur modernen Kultur (The sexual life of our time in its relation to modern civilization), Iwan Bloch, a German-Jewish physician, entreated elderly homosexuals to self-disclose to their family members and acquaintances. In 1914, Magnus Hirschfeld revisited the topic in his major work The Homosexuality of Men and Women, discussing the social and legal potentials of several thousand homosexual men and women of rank revealing their sexual orientation to the police in order to influence legislators and public opinion. Hirschfeld did not support self-denunciation and dismissed the possibilities of a political movement based on open homosexuals.

The first prominent American to reveal his homosexuality was the poet Robert Duncan. In 1944, using his own name in the anarchist magazine Politics, he wrote that homosexuals were an oppressed minority. The decidedly clandestine Mattachine Society, founded by Harry Hay and other veterans of the Wallace for President campaign in Los Angeles in 1950, moved into the public eye after Hal Call took over the group in San Francisco in 1953, with many gays emerging from the closet.

In 1951, Donald Webster Cory published his landmark The Homosexual in America, exclaiming, "Society has handed me a mask to wear ... Everywhere I go, at all times and before all sections of society, I pretend." Cory was a pseudonym, but his frank and openly subjective descriptions served as a stimulus to the emerging homosexual self-awareness and the nascent homophile movement.

In the 1960s, Frank Kameny came to the forefront of the struggle. Having been fired from his job as an astronomer for the Army Map service in 1957 for homosexual behavior, Kameny refused to go quietly. He openly fought his dismissal, eventually appealing it all the way to the US Supreme Court. As a vocal leader of the growing movement, Kameny argued for unapologetic public actions. The cornerstone of his conviction was that, "we must instill in the homosexual community a sense of worth to the individual homosexual", which could only be achieved through campaigns openly led by homosexuals themselves.
With the spread of consciousness raising (CR) in the late 1960s, coming out became a key strategy of the gay liberation movement to raise political consciousness to counter heterosexism and homophobia. At the same time and continuing into the 1980s, gay and lesbian social support discussion groups, some of which were called "coming-out groups", focused on sharing coming-out "stories" (experiences) with the goal of reducing isolation and increasing LGBT visibility and pride.

Etymology 
The present-day expression "coming out" is understood to have originated in the early 20th century from an analogy that likens homosexuals' introduction into gay subculture to a débutante's coming-out party. This is a celebration for a young upper-class woman who is making her début – her formal presentation to society – because she has reached adult age or has become eligible for marriage. As historian George Chauncey points out:
Gay people in the pre-war years [pre-WWI] ... did not speak of coming out of what we call "the gay closet" but rather of coming out into what they called "homosexual society" or the "gay world", a world neither so small, nor so isolated, nor, often, so hidden as "closet" implies.
In fact, as Elizabeth Kennedy observes, "using the term 'closet' to refer to" previous times such as "the 1920s and 1930s might be anachronistic".

An article on coming out in the online encyclopedia glbtq.com states that sexologist Evelyn Hooker's observations introduced the use of "coming out" to the academic community in the 1950s. The article continues by echoing Chauncey's observation that a subsequent shift in connotation occurred later on. The pre-1950s focus was on entrance into "a new world of hope and communal solidarity" whereas the post-Stonewall Riots overtone was an exit from the oppression of the closet. This change in focus suggests that "coming out of the closet" is a mixed metaphor that joins "coming out" with the closet metaphor: an evolution of "skeleton in the closet" specifically referring to living a life of denial and secrecy by concealing one's sexual orientation. The closet metaphor, in turn, is extended to the forces and pressures of heterosexist society and its institutions.

Identity issues 

When coming out is described as a gradual process or a journey, it is meant to include becoming aware of and acknowledging one's gender identity, gender expression, or non-hetero-normative sexual orientation or attraction. This preliminary stage, which involves soul-searching or a personal epiphany, is often called "coming out to oneself" and constitutes the start of self-acceptance. Many LGBT people say that this stage began for them during adolescence or childhood, when they first became aware of their sexual orientation toward members of the same sex. Coming out has also been described as a process because of a recurring need or desire to come out in new situations in which LGBT people are assumed to be heterosexual or cisgender, such as at a new job or with new acquaintances. A major frame of reference for those coming out has included using an inside/outside perspective, where some assume that the person can keep their identity or orientation a secret and separate from their outside appearance. This is not as simple as often thought, as Diana Fuss (1991) argues, "the problem of course with the inside/outside rhetoric ... is that such polemics disguise the fact that most of us are both inside and outside at the same time".

LGBT identity development 

Every coming out story is the person trying to come to terms with who they are and their sexual orientation. Several models have been created to describe coming out as a process for gay and lesbian identity development, e.g. Dank, 1971; Cass, 1984; Coleman, 1989; Troiden, 1989. Of these models, the most widely accepted is the Cass identity model established by Vivienne Cass. This model outlines six discrete stages transited by individuals who successfully come out: identity confusion, identity comparison, identity tolerance, identity acceptance, identity pride, and identity synthesis. However, not every LGBT person follows such a model. For example, some LGBT youth become aware of and accept their same-sex desires or gender identity at puberty in a way similar to which heterosexual teens become aware of their sexuality, i.e. free of any notion of difference, stigma or shame in terms of the gender of the people to whom they are attracted. Regardless of whether LGBT youth develop their identity based on a model, the typical age at which youth in the United States come out has been dropping. High school students and even middle school students are coming out.

Emerging research suggests that gay men from religious backgrounds are likely to come out online via Facebook and other social networks, such as blogs, as they offer a protective interpersonal distance. This largely contradicts the growing movement in social media research indicating that online use, particularly Facebook, can lead to negative mental health outcomes such as increased levels of anxiety. While further research is needed to assess whether these results generalize to a larger sample, these recent findings open the door to the possibility that gay men's online experiences may differ from heterosexuals' in that it may be more likely to provide mental health benefits than consequences.

Transgender identity and coming out

Transgender people vary greatly in choosing when, whether, and how to disclose their transgender status to family, close friends, and others. The prevalence of discrimination and violence against transgender people (in the United States, for example, transgender people are 28% more likely to be victims of violence) can make coming out a risky decision. Fear of retaliatory behavior, such as being removed from the parental home while underage, is a cause for transgender people to not come out to their families until they have reached adulthood. Parental confusion and lack of acceptance of a transgender child may result in parents treating a newly revealed gender identity as a "phase" or making efforts to change their children back to "normal" by utilizing mental health services to alter the child's gender identity.

The internet can play a significant role in the coming out process for transgender people. Some come out in an online identity first, providing an opportunity to go through experiences virtually and safely before risking social sanctions in the real world. However, while many trans people find support online that they may not have in real life, others encounter bullying and harassment when coming out online. According to a study published by Blumenfeld and Cooper in 2012, youth who identify as LGBT are 22% less likely to report online bullying due to factors such as parents not believing or understanding them, or fear of having to come out to explain the incident. This further shows the barriers that trans individuals can have when coming out.

Coming out as transgender can be more complex than coming out as a sexual minority. Visible changes that can occur as part of changing one's gender identitysuch as wardrobe changes, hormone replacement therapy, and name changescan make coming out to other people less of a choice. Further, things that accompany a change in gender can have financial, physical, medical, and legal implications. Additionally, transgender individuals can experience prejudice and rejection from sexual minorities and others in the LGBT community, in addition to the larger LGBT bias they can face from mainstream culture, which can feel isolating.

Legal issues 

In areas of the world where homosexual acts are penalized or prohibited, gay men, lesbians, and bisexual people can suffer negative legal consequences for coming out. In particular, where homosexuality is a crime, coming out may constitute self-incrimination. These laws still exist in 75 countries worldwide, including Egypt, Iran, and Afghanistan.

People who decide to come out as non-binary or transgender often face more varied and different issues from a legal standpoint. Worldwide, legally changing your documented gender or name based on your identity is often prohibited or extremely difficult. A major negative effect of the inequality in regulations comes in the form of mental effects, as transgender people who have to legally announce a gender they do not identify with or their dead name can face uncomfortable situations and stress.

Effects 
In the early stages of the LGBT identity development process, people can feel confused and experience turmoil. In 1993, Michelangelo Signorile wrote Queer in America, in which he explored the harm caused both to a closeted person and to society in general by being closeted.

Because LGBT people have historically been marginalized as sexual minorities, coming out of the closet remains a challenge for most of the world's LGBT population and can lead to a backlash of heterosexist discrimination and homophobic violence.

Studies have found that concealing sexual orientation is related to poorer mental health, physical health, and relationship functioning. For example, it has been found that same-sex couples who have not come out are not as satisfied in their relationships as same-sex couples who have. Findings from another study indicate that the fewer people know about a lesbian's sexual orientation, the more anxiety, less positive affectivity, and lower self-esteem she has.  Further, Gay.com states that closeted individuals are reported to be at increased risk for suicide.

Depending on the relational bond between parents and children, a child coming out as lesbian, gay, bisexual or transgender can be positive or negative. Strong, loving relationships between children and their parents may be strengthened but if a relationship is already strained, those relationships may be further damaged or destroyed by the child coming out. If people coming out are accepted by their parents, this allows open discussions of dating and relationships and allows parents to help their children with coping with discrimination and to make healthier decisions regarding HIV/AIDS. Because parents, families, and close others can reject someone coming out to them, the effects of coming out on LGBT individuals are not always positive. For example, teens who had parents who rejected them when they came out showed more drug use, depression, suicide attempts and risky sexual behaviors later on as young adults. Some studies find that the health effects of coming out depends more on the reactions of parents than on the disclosure itself.

A number of studies have been done on the effect of people coming out to their parents. A 1989 report by Robinson et al. of parents of out gay and lesbian children in the United States found that 21% of fathers and 28% of mothers had suspected that their child was gay or lesbian, largely based on gender atypical behaviour during childhood. The 1989 study found that two-thirds of parents reacted negatively. A 1995 study (that used young people's reactions) found that half of the mothers of gay or bisexual male college students "responded with disbelief, denial or negative comments" while fathers reacted slightly better. 18% of parents reacted "with acts of intolerance, attempts to convert the child to heterosexuality, and verbal threats to cut off financial or emotional support".

Homelessness is a common effect among LGBT youth during the coming out process. LGBT youth are among the largest population of homeless youth; this has typically been caused by the self-identification and acknowledgment of being gay or identifying with the LGBT community. About 20% to 30% of homeless youth identify as LGBT. 55% of homeless LGBQ and 67% of homeless transgender youth were forced out of their homes by their parents or run away because of their sexual orientation or gender identity and expression. Homelessness among LGBT youth also impacts many areas of an individual's life, leading to higher rates of victimization, depression, suicidal ideation, substance abuse, risky sexual behavior, and participation in more illegal and dangerous activities. A 2016 study on homelessness pathways among Latino LGBT youth found that homelessness among LGBT individuals can also be attributed to structural issues like systems of care and sociocultural and economic factors.

Jimmie Manning performed a study in 2015 on positive and negative behavior performed during the coming out conversation. During his study, he learned that almost all of his participants would only attribute negative behaviors to themselves during the coming out conversations and positive behaviors with the recipient of the conversation. Manning suggests further research into this to figure out a way for positive behaviors to be seen and performed equally by both the recipient and the individual coming out.

In/out metaphors

Dichotomy 
The closet narrative sets up an implicit dualism between being "in" or being "out" wherein those who are "in" are often stigmatized as living false, unhappy lives. Likewise, philosopher and critical analyst Judith Butler (1991) states that the in/out metaphor creates a binary opposition which pretends that the closet is dark, marginal, and false and that being out in the "light of illumination" reveals a true (or essential) identity. Nonetheless, Butler is willing to appear at events as a lesbian and maintains that "it is possible to argue that ... there remains a political imperative to use these necessary errors or category mistakes ... to rally and represent an oppressed political constituency".

Criticisms 
In addition Diana Fuss (1991) explains, "the problem of course with the inside/outside rhetoric ... is that such polemics disguise the fact that most of us are both inside and outside at the same time". Further, "To be out, in common gay parlance, is precisely to be no longer out; to be out is to be finally outside of exteriority and all the exclusions and deprivations such outsiderhood imposes. Or, put another way, to be out is really to be in—inside the realm of the visible, the speakable, the culturally intelligible." In other words, coming out constructs the closet it supposedly destroys and the self it supposedly reveals, "the first appearance of the homosexual as a 'species' rather than a 'temporary aberration' also marks the moment of the homosexual's disappearance—into the closet".

Furthermore, Seidman, Meeks, and Traschen (1999) argue that "the closet" may be becoming an antiquated metaphor in the lives of modern-day Americans for two reasons.
 Homosexuality is becoming increasingly normalized and the shame and secrecy often associated with it appears to be in decline.
 The metaphor of the closet hinges upon the notion that stigma management is a way of life.  However, stigma management may actually be increasingly done situationally.

National Coming Out Day 

Observed annually on 11 October, by members of the LGBT communities and their allies, National Coming Out Day is an international civil awareness day for coming out and discussing LGBT issues among the general populace in an effort to give a familiar face to the LGBT rights movement. This day was the inspiration for holding LGBT History Month in the United States in October. The day was founded in 1988, by Robert Eichberg, his partner William Gamble, and Jean O'Leary to celebrate the Second National March on Washington for Lesbian and Gay Rights one year earlier, in which 500,000 people marched on Washington, DC, United States, for gay and lesbian equality. In the United States, the Human Rights Campaign manages the event under the National Coming Out Project, offering resources to LGBT individuals, couples, parents, and children, as well as straight friends and relatives, to promote awareness of LGBT families living honest and open lives. Candace Gingrich became the spokesperson for the day in April 1995. Although still named "National Coming Out Day", it is observed in Canada, Germany, the Netherlands, and Switzerland also on 11 October, and in the United Kingdom on 12 October. To celebrate National Coming Out Day on 11 October 2002, Human Rights Campaign released an album bearing the same title as that year's theme: Being Out Rocks. Participating artists include Kevin Aviance, Janis Ian, k.d. lang, Cyndi Lauper, Sarah McLachlan, and Rufus Wainwright.

Media

Highly publicized comings-out

Government officials and political candidates 
In 1983, Democratic US House representative Gerry Studds from Massachusetts came out as a homosexual during the 1983 congressional page sex scandal.
In 1988, Svend Robinson was the first member of House of Commons of Canada to come out.
In 1999, Australian senator Brian Greig came out as being gay in his maiden speech to parliament, the first Australian politician to do so.
In 2004, New Jersey governor Jim McGreevey announced his decision to resign, publicly came out as "a gay American", and admitted to having had an extramarital affair with a man, Golan Cipel, an Israeli citizen and veteran of the Israeli Defense Forces, whom McGreevey had appointed New Jersey homeland security adviser.

Athletes 

The first US professional team-sport athlete to come out was former NFL running back David Kopay, who played for five teams (San Francisco, Detroit, Washington, New Orleans and Green Bay) between 1964 and 1972. He came out in 1975 in an interview in the Washington Star. The first professional athlete to come out while still playing was Czech-American professional tennis player Martina Navratilova, who came out as a lesbian during an interview with The New York Times in 1981. English footballer Justin Fashanu came out in 1990 and was subject to homophobic taunts from spectators, opponents and teammates for the rest of his career.

In 1995 while at the peak of his playing career, Ian Roberts became the first high-profile Australian sports person and first rugby footballer in the world to come out to the public as gay. John Amaechi, who played in the NBA with the Utah Jazz, Orlando Magic and Cleveland Cavaliers (as well as internationally with Panathinaikos BC of the Greek Basketball League and Kinder Bologna of the Italian Basketball League), came out in February 2007 on ESPN's Outside the Lines program. He also released a book Man in the Middle, published by ESPN Books which talks about his professional and personal life as a closeted basketball player. He was the first NBA player (former or current) to come out.

In 2008, Australian diver Matthew Mitcham became the first openly gay athlete to win an Olympic gold medal. He achieved this at the Beijing Olympics in the men's 10 meter platform event.

The first Irish county GAA player to come out while still playing was hurler Dónal Óg Cusack in October 2009 in previews of his autobiography. Gareth Thomas, who played international rugby union and rugby league for Wales, came out in a Daily Mail interview in December 2009 near the end of his career.

In 2013, basketball player Jason Collins (a member of the Washington Wizards) came out as gay, becoming the first active male professional athlete in a major North American team sport to publicly come out as gay.

On 15 August 2013, WWE wrestler Darren Young came out, making him the first openly gay active professional wrestler.

On 9 February 2014, former Missouri defensive lineman Michael Sam came out as gay. He was drafted by the St. Louis Rams on 10 May 2014, with the 249th overall pick in the seventh round, making him the first openly gay player to be drafted by an NFL franchise. He was released by St. Louis and waived by the Dallas Cowboys practice squad. Sam was on the roster for the Montreal Alouettes, but has since retired from football.

On 21 June 2021, Las Vegas Raiders defensive end Carl Nassib announced on his Instagram account that he is gay, becoming the first active NFL player to come out publicly.

In October 2021, professional soccer player Josh Cavallo came out as gay via videos posted to his team's social media accounts, becoming the only openly gay top-level professional soccer player in the world.

Artists and entertainers 

In 1997 on The Oprah Winfrey Show, American comedian Ellen DeGeneres came out as a lesbian. Her real-life coming out was echoed in the sitcom Ellen in "The Puppy Episode", in which her character Ellen Morgan outs herself over the airport public address system.

On 29 March 2010, Puerto Rican singer Ricky Martin came out publicly in a post on his official web site by stating, "I am proud to say that I am a fortunate homosexual man. I am very blessed to be who I am." Martin said that "these years in silence and reflection made me stronger and reminded me that acceptance has to come from within and that this kind of truth gives me the power to conquer emotions I didn't even know existed." Singer Adam Lambert came out after pictures of him kissing another man were publicly circulated while he was a participant on the eighth season of American Idol. In January 2013, while accepting the honorary Golden Globe Cecil B. DeMille Award, American actress and director Jodie Foster made the first public acknowledgment of her sexual orientation, saying; "I already did my coming out a thousand years ago, in the Stone Age, in those very quaint days when a fragile young girl would open up to friends and family and co-workers then gradually to everyone that knew her, everyone she actually met."

Military personnel 
In 1975, Leonard Matlovich, while serving in the United States Air Force, came out to challenge the US military's policies banning service by homosexuals. Widespread coverage included a Time magazine cover story and a television movie on NBC.

In 2011, as the US prepared to lift restrictions on service by openly gay people, Senior Airman Randy Phillips conducted a social media campaign to garner support for coming out. The video he posted on YouTube of the conversation in which he told his father he was gay went viral. In one journalist's summation, he "masterfully used social media and good timing to place himself at the centre of a civil rights success story".

Pastors 
In October 2010, megachurch pastor Bishop Jim Swilley came out to his congregation. The YouTube video of the service went viral. Interviews with People magazine, Joy Behar, Don Lemon ABC News and NPR focused on the bullycides that prompted Bishop Swilley to "come out". One year later, he confirmed the costs but also the freedom he has experienced. "To be able to have freedom is something that I wouldn't trade anything for." "Being married as yourself, preaching as yourself and living your life as yourself is infinitely better than doing those things as someone else." Bishop Swilley's son, Jared Swilley, bass player and front man of Black Lips said, "It was definitely shocking, but I was actually glad when he told me. I feel closer to him now". Bishop Swilley's other son, Judah Swilley, a cast member on the Oxygen show Preachers of Atlanta, is confronting homophobia in the church.

Journalists
In August 2019, a sportswriter and broadcaster contributing at The Guardian and ESPN came out, informing that she is now Nicky Bandini and was previously writing under the name Paolo Bandini. The football journalist highlighted through a Twitter video and an accompanying article on The Guardian that it took her several years to come out as transgender publicly. Bandini also went through gender dysphoria for three-and-a-half decades before finally admitting it to the world.

Depictions of coming out 

In 1996, the acclaimed British film Beautiful Thing had a positive take in its depiction of two teenage boys coming to terms with their sexual identity. In 1987, a two-part episode of the Quebec television series Avec un grand A, "Lise, Pierre et Marcel", depicted a married closeted man who has to come out when his wife discovers that he has been having an affair with another man. In the Emmy Award-nominated episode "Gay Witch Hunt" of The Office, Michael inadvertently outs Oscar to the whole office.

Author Rodger Streitmatter described Ellen DeGeneres's coming out in the media as well as an episode of Ellen, "The Puppy Episode", as "rank[ing], hands down, as the single most public exit in gay history", changing media portrayals of lesbians in Western culture. In 1999, Russell T Davies's Queer as Folk, a popular TV series shown on the UK's Channel 4 debuted and focused primarily on the lives of young gay men; in particular on a 15-year-old going through the processes of revealing his sexuality to those around him. This storyline was also featured prominently in the US version of Queer as Folk, which debuted in 2000.

The television show The L Word, which debuted in 2004, focuses on the lives of a group of lesbian and bisexual women, and the theme of coming out is prominently featured in the storylines of multiple characters.

Coming Out, which debuted in 2013, is the first Quebec television program about being gay.

The third season of the Norwegian teen drama series Skam focused on a main character coming out and his relationship with another boy.

The film Love, Simon, based on the book Simon vs. the Homo Sapiens Agenda, debuted in 2018 and is the first major studio film about a gay teenager coming out.

Extended use in LGBT media, publishing and activism 
"Out" is a common word or prefix used in the titles of LGBT-themed books, films, periodicals, organizations, and TV programs. Some high-profile examples are Out magazine, the defunct OutWeek, and OutTV.

Non-LGBT contexts 
In political, casual, or even humorous contexts, "coming out" means by extension the self-disclosure of a person's secret behaviors, beliefs, affiliations, tastes, identities, and interests that may cause astonishment or bring shame. Some examples include: "coming out as an alcoholic", "coming out as a BDSM participant", "coming out of the broom closet" (as a witch), "coming out as a conservative", "coming out as disabled", "coming out as a liberal", "coming out as intersex", "coming out as multiple", "coming out as polyamorous", "coming out as a sex worker", and "coming out of the shadows" as an undocumented immigrant within the United States. The term is also used by members of online body integrity dysphoria communities to refer to the process of telling friends and families about their condition.

With its associated metaphors, the figure of speech has also been extended to atheism, e.g., "coming out as an atheist". A public awareness initiative for freethought and atheism, entitled the "Out Campaign", makes ample use of the "out" metaphor. This campaign was initiated by Robin Elisabeth Cornwell, and is endorsed by prominent atheist Richard Dawkins, who states "there is a big closet population of atheists who need to 'come out.

See also 

 Biphobia
 Down-low (sexual slang)
 Ego-dystonic sexual orientation
 Intersex and LGBT
 Labeling theory
 Liberal homophobia
 Questioning (sexuality and gender)
 Terminology of homosexuality

References

Further reading 
 Argent, Jay (2017) Coming Out: High School Boys Share Their Stories. [Charleston]: CreateSpace Independent Publishing. 
 Beasley, Neil (2016) Football's Coming Out: Life as a Gay Fan and Player. [London]: Floodlit Dreams Ltd. 
 Berube, Allan (2010) Coming Out under Fire: The History of Gay Men and Women in World War Two (2nd edition). Chapel Hill: University of North Carolina Press. 
 Blaschke, Ronny (2008) Versteckspieler: Die Geschichte des schwulen Fußballers Marcus Urban. Göttingen: Verlag Die Werkstatt. 
 Dossie Easton, Catherine A. Liszt, When Someone You Love Is Kinky. Greenery Press, 2000. .
 Kinsella, Vinne (2016) Fashionably Late: Gay, Bi, and Trans Men Who Came Out Later in Life. Portland: Eldredge Books 
 LaSala, Michael (2010) Coming Out, Coming Home: Helping Families Adjust to a Gay or Lesbian Child. New York: Columbia University Press.  

 Rogers, Robbie; Marcus, Eric (2014) Coming Out to Play. London: The Robson Press. 
 Seidman, Steven. Beyond the Closet: The Transformation of Gay and Lesbian Life. Routledge, 2003. .
 Stramel, James. Gay Virtue: The Ethics of Disclosure. Dissertation, University of Southern California, 1996.

LGBT terminology
Metaphors
LGBT and society
Secrecy